The UConn Huskies field hockey team represents the University of Connecticut in the sport of field hockey in the NCAA Division I level Big East Conference.  The team plays at the George J. Sherman Family-Sports Complex, and is coached by Nancy Stevens, the most successful coach in college field hockey.  The Huskies have won five national championships, including 2013, 2014, and 2017, also finished as runner up twice, and appeared in 15 total Final Fours.  They have also won 16 Big East Conference Field Hockey Tournament titles, most in conference history.

Notable players

Internationals

 Cécile Pieper
 
 Sophie Hamilton
 
 Roisin Upton

Head coaches

See also
List of NCAA Division I field hockey programs

References

External links
 Official website